Reality Check may refer to:
Reality Check (comics), an English language manga series
Reality Check (program), an anti-tobacco movement led by teenagers and operated by the New York State Department of Health
Reality check, a technique used in lucid dreaming to determine whether one is actually dreaming
Reality Check, the signature move of wrestler The Miz
Reality Check, daily comic strip since 1995 by Dave Whamond

Television 
Reality Check (American TV series), a 1995 syndicated television series
Reality Check (2013 TV series), a Hong Kong television drama produced by TVB
Reality Check (Australian TV series), a 2014 Australian television panel discussion program
"Reality Check", a recurring segment on the sketch comedy show Mad TV

Music 
Reality Check (Jassi Sidhu album), a 2003 album by Punjabi singer, Jassi Sidhu
Reality Check (Juvenile album), a 2006 album by rapper Juvenile
Reality Check (Seagram album), a 1995 album by rapper Seagram
Reality Check (The Teenagers album), a 2008 album by The Teenagers
Reality Check (band), a Christian music band
"Reality Check", a song by Binary Star from Masters of the Universe
"Reality Check", a song by Man Overboard from Heavy Love
"Reality Cheque", a song by Status Quo from Quid Pro Quo

Literature 
Reality Check (novel), a 2009 novel by Peter Abrahams
"Reality Check", a science fiction short story by David Brin
"Reality Check", a science fiction short story by Michael A. Burstein